Digital photograph restoration is the practice of restoring the appearance of a digital copy of a physical photograph that has been damaged by natural, man-made, or environmental causes, or affected by age or neglect.

Digital photograph restoration uses image editing techniques to remove undesired visible features, such as dirt, scratches, or signs of aging. People use raster graphics editors to repair digital images, or to add or replace torn or missing pieces of the physical photograph. Unwanted color casts are removed and the image's contrast or sharpening may be altered to restore the contrast range or detail believed to have been in the original physical image. Digital image processing techniques included in image enhancement and image restoration software are also applied to digital photograph restoration.

Background

Agents of deterioration
Photographic material is susceptible to physical, chemical and biological damage caused by physical forces, thieves and vandals, fire, water, pests, pollutants, light, incorrect temperature, incorrect relative humidity, and dissociation (custodial neglect). Traditionally, preservation efforts focused on physical photographs, but preservation of a photograph's digital surrogates has become of equal importance.

Handling practices
Fragile or valuable originals are protected when digital surrogates replace them, and severely damaged photographs that cannot be repaired physically are revitalized when a digital copy is made. Creation of digital surrogates allows originals to be preserved. However, the digitization process itself contributes to the object's wear and tear. It is considered important to ensure the original photograph is minimally damaged by environmental changes or careless handling.

Permissible uses
Digitally scanned or captured images, both unaltered and restored image files are protected under copyright law. Courts agree that by its basic nature digitization involves reproduction—an act exclusively reserved for copyright owners. The ownership of an artwork does not inherently carry with it the rights of reproduction.

Images that are digitally reproduced and restored often reflect the intentions of the photographer of the original photograph. It is not recommended that conservators change or add additional information based on personal or institutional bias or opinion. Even without copyright permission, museums can digitally copy and restore images for conservation or informational purposes.

Gallery

See also
Infrared cleaning
Media preservation
Photo manipulation
Photograph preservation

References

External links
 

Conservation and restoration of cultural heritage
Science of photography
Photographic techniques